The 2010 CIS Men's University Cup Hockey Tournament (48th Annual) was held March 25–28, 2010. It was the second year of a two-year CIS Championship bid by Lakehead University and hosted at Fort William Gardens hockey rink. The UNB Varsity Reds would not be defending their title from 2009, despite a 27-1 record, as they lost in the second round of the AUS playoffs and did not advance.

Similar to previous years, going back to the introduction of the expanded format in 1998, the six invited teams were split into two(2) Pools of three(3) where each team plays the other(two games total). The best team in each Pool advances to the final. All pool games must be decided by a win, there are no ties. If a pool has a three-way tie for 1st (all teams have 1-1 records) than GF/GA differential among the tied teams is the first tie-breaker.

The Saint Mary's Huskies won their first Hockey title in school history with a dramatic 3–2 overtime win versus the #1 seed Alberta Golden Bears who were looking for their 14th.

Road to the Cup

AUS playoffs

OUA Playoffs

Note: with Lakehead winning the OUA-West title, they have advanced to the University Cup as a Queen's Cup finalist. As such, an OUA Bronze medal (third place) game was required to determine the 'designated host'.

Canada West playoffs

University Cup 
The six teams to advance to the tournament are listed below. The wild-card team was selected from the CW Conference as the AUS was provided the wild-card in 2009 and OUA teams are ineligible as they are the host conference. To avoid having Alberta and Manitoba in the same pool (Pool A seeds 1-4-6), Manitoba must be seeded 5th which leaves Lakehead and UQTR in 4th and 6th respectively.

Pool A - Evening

Pool B - Afternoon

Championship final

Tournament All-Stars
Andrew Hotham, a defenseman from the Saint Mary's Huskies, was selected as the Major W.J. 'Danny' McLeod Award for CIS University Cup MVP. He was tied in tournament scoring with 5 points (two goals and three assists) with teammate Cody Thornton. Andrew was Saint Mary's MVP in their second game versus Manitoba and had the team's second goal in the championship final.

Joining Hotham on the tournament all-star team were:

Goaltender: Neil Conway, Saint Mary's
Defenceman: Ian Barteaux, Alberta
Forward: Cody Thornton, Saint Mary's
Forward: Cam Fergus, Saint Mary's
Forward: Chad Klassen, Alberta

References

External links
 Tournament Results Website

U Sports ice hockey
University Cup, 2010